I Heart Huckabees is the 2004 soundtrack album by Jon Brion for the film of the same name.

Track listing
"Monday" – 2:08
"Knock Yourself Out" – 2:10
"Strange Bath" – 0:57
"Cubes" – 1:42
"Didn't Think It Would Turn Out Bad" – 2:41
"Coincidences" – 1:19
"Over Our Heads" – 2:29
"You Learn" – 2:20
"Later Monday" – 2:08
"Ska" – 1:18
"Wouldn't Have It Any Other Way" – 1:24
"Huckabees Jingle (50's Version)" – 0:20
"Revolving Door" – 4:33
"JB's Blues" – 2:17
"True To Yourself" – 2:47
"Didn't Think It Would Turn Out Bad (String Quartet Version)" – 1:49
"Strangest Times" – 1:56
"Omni" – 1:38
"Get What It's About" – 5:59
"Monday (End Credits)" – 1:44

Comedy film soundtracks
Jon Brion albums
Albums produced by Jon Brion
2004 soundtrack albums